Riffle darner may refer to:

 Oplonaeschna armata, a North American dragonfly species
 Notoaeschna, a genus of Australian dragonflies including two species:
Notoaeschna geminata – northern riffle darner
Notoaeschna sagittata – southern riffle darner